Guignardia mangiferae is a plant pathogen.

References

External links

Fungal plant pathogens and diseases
Botryosphaeriaceae
Fungi described in 1968